Charly is a 1968 film starring Cliff Robertson in an Academy Award-winning performance. 
It may also refer to:

People
 Charly (name)

Entertainment 
Charly Records, a British record label
 "Charly" (song), a 1991 single by The Prodigy
 Charly, a 1980 novel and 2002 movie by Jack Weyland
 Charly Black (born 1980), Jamaican reggae music artist from Rio Bueno

Places
 Charly-sur-Marne, in the Aisne department
 Charly, Cher, in the Cher department
 Charly, Rhône, in the Rhône department
 Charly-Oradour, in the Moselle department

Other
 Operation Charly, countering left-wing activities in Central America

See also
 Charlie (disambiguation)
 Charley (disambiguation)